Get Lost is the fifth studio album by American indie pop band The Magnetic Fields, released on October 24, 1995.

Cover versions

The Divine Comedy have recorded covers of two Magnetic Fields songs, both from this album. "Love Is Lighter Than Air" appears as the B-side of their 1996 single "Something for the Weekend", while their version of "With Whom to Dance" appears as the B-side of their 1999 single "The Pop Singer's Fear of the Pollen Count'".

Tracey Thorn has recorded covers of several Magnetic Fields songs. "Smoke and Mirrors" from Get Lost appears as the B-side of her 2007 single "Raise the Roof", together with her version of "The Book of Love" from 69 Love Songs.

Advance Base recorded a version of "You and Me and the Moon" for the 2018 album Animal Companionship.

Track listing
 CD

 Vinyl

Personnel

 The Magnetic Fields
Stephin Merritt – vocals, instrumentation
Claudia Gonson – drums, vocals, ukulele
Sam Davol – cello, flute
John Woo – guitar, banjo

Additional personnel
Julie Cooper – bass guitar
Natalie Lithwick – French vocals

 Production

Get Lost was produced by Stephin Merritt. Kelly McKaig was the recording assistant, Eric Masunaga was the technical advisor and occasional mixer. The spoken word French vocals on the song "Smoke and Mirrors" were translated by Andrew Beaujon.

Eve Prime photographed the cover art for the album. The models in the photo are, from left to right, cellist Sam Davol, Ilsa Jule, Gail O'Hara, Michael Cavadias and Leslie Taylor (who would later go on to wed Sam Davol in 1997). Ashley Salisbury was the stylist.

Lilly of the Valley is listed in the liner notes as being one of the "cover models." It is a church in the Bronx and was the location of the photoshoot.

The tray card was photographed by John Woo.

References

1995 albums
The Magnetic Fields albums
Merge Records albums